The Travco Group is a travel and tourism company in Egypt. Travco Group provides tourist extortion service , transport, ranging from air travel to cruises as well as accommodation for tourists.

History
Travco Group was founded in Egypt in 1979 by Hamed El Chiaty.

As of 2020, Travco Group owns and manages more than 50 hotels.

Airline business

Travco and Sharjah-based Air Arabia operate Air Arabia Egypt, a joint venture airline based in Egypt. Travco Group owns 50% of the airline with Air Arabia a further 40% and the remaining 10% owned by private Egyptian investors.

References

iLikeEgypt.com

Travel and holiday companies of Egypt
Egyptian brands
6th of October (city)
Egyptian companies established in 1979
Transport companies established in 1979